The Beacon (later renamed Haunting at the Beacon) is a 2009 American horror/thriller film directed and written by Michael Stokes. The second film by Sabbatical Pictures, it was shot at The Rogers Hotel in Waxahachie, Texas and debuted in seven cities in October 2009. It was shown at the 2009 Paranoia Film Festival, where it was awarded Best Picture and Best Actress (Teri Polo). It was also shown at the 2009 LA Femme Film Festival.

Plot
While trying to get their lives back on track after the loss of their four-year-old son, Bryn and Paul Shaw move to the charming old Beacon Apartments. Bryn begins seeing a ghostly little boy skulking around the building. With the help of an eccentric young professor and a tough old beat cop, Bryn tries to uncover the details of the boy's death, hoping that freeing him will allow him to carry a message to her son. She then realizes a second, malevolent entity stalks the Beacon's halls, one that doesn't want the boy to escape.

Cast
 Teri Polo as Bryn Shaw
 David Rees Snell as Paul Shaw
 Elaine Hendrix as Vanessa Carver
 Ken Howard as Officer Bobby Ford
 Marnette Patterson as Christina Wade
 Nick Sowell as Will Tyler
 Michael Ironside as Lt. Hutton
 Jonny Cruz as Simón Valencia

References

External links
 

2009 films
Films set in apartment buildings
2000s English-language films